The men's freestyle 65 kilograms is a competition featured at the 2021 U23 World Wrestling Championships, and was held in Belgrade, Serbia  on 5 and 6 November.

Medalists

Results
Legend
F — Won by fall
WO — Won by walkover
R — Retired

Final

Top half

Bottom half

Repechage

References

External links
Official website

Men's freestyle 65 kg